Patricias Argentinas was fourteen women who on 30 May 1812 called for the collection of funds for the equipment of the rebel army fighting for freedom from Spain during the Argentine War of Independence. Each one of the signatures of the list financed one pistol each, and their example was followed by others. This was considered vital for the success of the war, as the Argentine army was very insufficiently equipped at the time.

Signatures of the original list 
 Tomasa de la Quintana 
 María de los Remedios de Escalada
 María de las Nieves de Escalada
 María Eugenia de Escalada de Demaría
 María de la Quintana
 María Sánchez de Thompson
 Carmen de la Quintanilla de Alvear
 Ramona Esquivel y Aldao
 Petrona Bernardina Cordero
 Rufina de Orma
 Isabel Calvimontes de Agrelo
 Magdalena de Castro de Herrero
 Ángela Castelli de Irgazábal
 María de la Encarnación Andonaégui de Valdepares.

References 
 Cutolo, V. O. (1994). Buenos Aires: Historia de las calles y sus nombres. Buenos Aires: Elche. .

External links
 

Argentine War of Independence
1812 in Argentina